Thudellage Charitha Buddhika Fernando (also known as Charitha Buddika; born 22 August 1980) is a former Sri Lankan cricketer, who played Tests and One Day International matches for the national side. He is a right-handed batsman and a right-arm medium-fast bowler.

Early and domestic career
Charitha is a past student of St. John's College Panadura. He made his Twenty20 debut on 17 August 2004, for Colombo Cricket Club in the 2004 SLC Twenty20 Tournament.

International career
Buddhika made a good One Day International debut, taking a wicket with his first legal delivery and finishing the match with figures of five wickets for 67 runs, the second-best bowling figures for a Sri Lankan player in their debut match. He subsequently made his debut for the Sri Lankan Test team.

After nine Tests and some inconsistent performances he was dropped.

See also
 List of bowlers who have taken a wicket with their first ball in a format of international cricket

References

External links
 

Sri Lankan cricketers
1980 births
Living people
Sri Lanka Test cricketers
Sri Lanka One Day International cricketers
Cricketers at the 2003 Cricket World Cup
Panadura Sports Club cricketers
Cricketers who have taken five wickets on One Day International debut
Ruhuna cricketers
Alumni of St. John's College, Panadura
People from Panadura